Juan Aguilera defeated Boris Becker in the final, 6–1, 6–0, 7–6(9–7) to win the singles tennis title at the 1990 Hamburg European Open.

Ivan Lendl was the reigning champion, but did not compete this year.

Seeds
A champion seed is indicated in bold text while text in italics indicates the round in which that seed was eliminated. The top eight seeds received a bye to the second round.

Draw

Finals

Top half

Section 1

Section 2

Bottom half

Section 3

Section 4

External links
 1990 ATP German Open draw

Singles